This article contains information about the literary events and publications of 1909.

Events
January – T. E. Hulme's poems "Autumn" and "A City Sunset" are included in the Poets' Club anthology For Christmas MDCCCCVIII, as the first examples of Imagism.
January 15 – Filippo Tommaso Marinetti's drama La donna è mobile opens at the Teatro Alfieri, Turin.
February 1 – The first issue appears of La Nouvelle Revue Française, a literary magazine founded in Paris by André Gide, Jacques Copeau, Jean Schlumberger, Gaston Gallimard, and others.
February 20 – Filippo Tommaso Marinetti's Futurist Manifesto first appears in the French newspaper Le Figaro.
March 2 – Katherine Mansfield, while pregnant by another man, marries the singing teacher George Bowden, whom she barely knows. She leaves him the same evening to resume lesbian relations with Ida Baker.
April
The opening night of Filippo Tommaso Marinetti's drama Le Roi bombance (The Feasting King, written 1905) is heckled by the audience and the writer himself. 
The German periodical Die Tat is founded by Ernst Horneffer.
April 24 – The Metropolitan Library (Jīngshī Túshūguǎn) in Beijing, predecessor of the National Library of China, is founded by the Qing government.
September 6 – Israel Zangwill's play The Melting Pot opens in New York City.
September 23 – Gaston Leroux's novel The Phantom of the Opera (Le Fantôme de l'Opéra) begins serialization in the Paris newspaper Le Gaulois.
September 29 – Franz Kafka's short story "The Aeroplanes at Brescia (Die Aeroplane in Brescia)", based on a real event, is published in the Prague newspaper Bohemia, as the first description of airplanes in German literature.
November – E. M. Forster's science fiction short story "The Machine Stops" is published in The Oxford and Cambridge Review.
unknown date – Babelstornið (The Tower of Babel), by Rasmus Rasmussen, writing as Regin í Líð, becomes the first Faroese language novel to be published.

New books

Fiction
Florence Barclay – The Rosary
Maurice Barrès – Colette Baudoche
André Billy – La Derive
Algernon Blackwood
The Education of Uncle Paul
Jimbo: A Fantasy
René Boylesve – La Jeune Fille bien élevée (The Well-raised Girl)
Hall Caine – The White Prophet
Gilbert Cannan – Peter Homunculus
Ion Luca Caragiale – Kir Ianulea
Robert W. Chambers – The Danger Mark
Herbert Croly – The Promise of American Life
Em Kol Chai (Chava Shapiro) – Kovetz Tziurim (קבץ ציורים, A Collection of Sketches)
Concha Espina – That Luzmela Girl
Charles Hoy Fort – The Outcast Manufacturers
Anatole France – Balthazar
Jacques Futrelle – Elusive Isabel
John Galsworthy – Fraternity
Charles Garvice – A Fair Impostor
Robert Hichens – Bella Donna
Olha Kobylianska – V Nediliu Rano Zillia Kopala (She Gathered Herbs on Sunday Morning)
Maurice Leblanc – The Hollow Needle
Gaston Leroux – Le fauteuil hanté (The Haunted Chair)
Jack London – Martin Eden
John Masefield – Multitude and Solitude
Silas Weir Mitchell – The Red City
Baroness Orczy
The Nest of the Sparrowhawk
The Old Man in the Corner
Randall Parrish – My Lady of the South
Eden Phillpotts – The Haven
Luigi Pirandello – I vecchi e i giovani (The Old and the Young, part 1)
Władysław Reymont – Chłopi (The Peasants; publication completed)
Stein Riverton – Jernvognen (The Iron Carriage)
Olivia Shakespear – Uncle Hilary
Gertrude Stein – Three Lives
Gene Stratton-Porter – A Girl of the Limberlost
Hermann Sudermann – The Song of Songs
Mark Twain – Captain Stormfield's Visit to Heaven
 Edgar Wallace 
 Captain Tatham of Tatham Island
 The Duke in the Suburbs
Robert Walser – Jakob von Gunten
Mary Augusta Ward – Daphne
H. G. Wells
Ann Veronica
Tono-Bungay

Children and young people
L. Frank Baum
The Road to Oz
Aunt Jane's Nieces at Work (as Edith Van Dyne)
Angela Brazil – The Nicest Girl in the School
Lucy Maud Montgomery – Anne of Avonlea
Beatrix Potter
The Tale of the Flopsy Bunnies
The Tale of Ginger and Pickles
P. G. Wodehouse – Mike

Drama
Paul Armont and Nicolas Nancey – Théodore et Cie
Sem Benelli – The Jester's Supper (La cena delle beffe)
Clyde Fitch – The City
John Galsworthy – Strife
Harley Granville-Barker – The Madras House
Cicely Hamilton – A Pageant of Great Women
Agha Hashar Kashmiri – Khwab-e-Hasti (The Dream World of Existence) 
Oskar Kokoschka – Murderer, the Hope of Women (Mörder, Hoffnung der Frauen)
Else Lasker-Schüler – Die Wupper (published)
André de Lorde – L'horrible expérience
Ferenc Molnár – Liliom
Quintero brothers – El patinillo
George Bernard Shaw – The Shewing-Up of Blanco Posnet

Poetry

Guillaume Apollinaire – L'Enchanteur pourrissant (The Putrifying Enchanter)
François Mauriac – Les Mains jointes (Clasped Hands)
John Millington Synge – Poems and Translations

Non-fiction
Henry James – Italian Hours
William James – A Pluralistic Universe
Jane's All the World's Aircraft (first annual edition)
Daniel Jones – The Pronunciation of English
C. I. Scofield (ed.) – Scofield Reference Bible
Charlotte Fell Smith – John Dee, 1527–1608
Eraclie Sterian – În noaptea nunții (On Your Wedding Night)
A. E. Waite – The Hidden Church of the Holy Graal
Alice Zimmern – Women's Suffrage in Many Lands

Births
January 20 – Mae Virginia Cowdery, African American poet (died 1953)
January 18 – Oskar Davičo, Serbian novelist and poet (died 1989)
January 29 – Phoebe Hesketh (Phoebe Rayner), English poet (died 2005)
February 15 – Miep Gies (Hermine Santruschitz), Austrian-born biographer (died 2010)
February 24 – August Derleth, American anthologist (died 1971)
March 6 – Stanisław Jerzy Lec, Polish aphorist and poet (died 1966)
March 17 – Margiad Evans, Anglo-Welsh poet, novelist and illustrator (died 1958)
March 22 – Gabrielle Roy, French Canadian author (died 1983)
March 28 – Nelson Algren, American novelist (died 1981)
March 31 – Robert Brasillach, French author (died 1945)
April 8 – John Fante, American novelist (died 1983)
May 1 – Yiannis Ritsos, Greek poet (died 1990)
May 5 – Miklós Radnóti, Hungarian poet (died 1944)
May 9 – Robert Garioch, Scottish poet (died 1981)
June 6 – Isaiah Berlin, German philosopher (died 1997)
June 19 – Osamu Dazai (太宰 治), Japanese author (died 1948)
June 28 – Eric Ambler, English novelist (died 1998)
July 1 – Juan Carlos Onetti, Uruguayan writer (died 1994)
July 8 – Petar Šegedin, Croatian diplomat, novelist and essayist (died 1998)
July 17 – G. P. Wells, son and co-author of H. G. Wells (died 1985)
July 28 – Malcolm Lowry, English novelist (died 1957)
July 29 – Chester Himes, American writer (died 1984)
July 30 – C. Northcote Parkinson, English historian and author (died 1993)
August 3 – Walter Van Tilburg Clark, American novelist (died 1971)
August 11 – Uku Masing, Estonian religious philosopher, linguist and writer (died 1985)
August 19 – Jerzy Andrzejewski, Polish author (died 1983)
October 24 – Sheila Watson (Sheila Doherty), Canadian novelist and critic (died 1998)
November 12 – Laxmi Prasad Devkota, Nepali poet, playwright, and novelist (died 1959)
November 26 – Eugène Ionesco (Eugen Ionescu), Romanian-born French playwright (died 1994)
November 27 – James Agee, American writer (died 1955)
December 14 – Ronald Welch (Ronald Oliver Felton), Welsh novelist and children's writer writing in English (died 1982)
December 16 – Edgar Mittelholzer, Guyanese novelist (suicide 1965)

Deaths
January 1 – Mollie Evelyn Moore Davis, American poet, writer, and editor (born 1844)
January 14 – William à Beckett, English journalist (born 1844)
January 22 – Hattie Tyng Griswold, American author (born 1842)
February 11 – Russell Sturgis, American art critic (born 1836)
March 24 – John Millington Synge, Irish dramatist and poet (born 1871)
March 27 (probable) – John Davidson, Scottish poet (born 1857)
April 9
Francis Marion Crawford, American novelist (born 1854)
Paschal Grousset, French journalist and science fiction writer (born 1844)
April 12 – Algernon Charles Swinburne, English poet (born 1837)
April 21 – Denys Corbet, Guernsey poet writing in Guernsey French and English (born 1826)
April 26 – Marcus Dods, Scottish theologian (born 1834)
May 18 – George Meredith, English novelist and poet (born 1828)
June 11 – Jacob Mikhailovich Gordin, American dramatist (born 1853)
June 24 – Sarah Orne Jewett, American writer (born 1849)
July 8 – Albert Craig (The Surrey Poet), English cricket writer (born 1850)
July 9 – Rosa Nouchette Carey, English children's writer (born 1840)
August 15 – Euclides da Cunha, Brazilian writer, shot (born 1866)
August 18 – Theodore Martin, Scottish-born writer (born 1816)
August 21 – George Cabot Lodge, American poet (born 1873)
August 23 – Liu E (劉鶚, Liu O), Chinese scholar, entrepreneur and novelist (born 1857)
August 26 – George Manville Fenn, English novelist and educationalist (born 1831)
September 4 – Clyde Fitch, American playwright (born 1865)
September 19 – József Borovnyák, Slovene writer, politician and priest (born 1826) 
October 16 – Jakub Bart-Ćišinski, Upper Sorbian poet, writer, playwright and translator (born 1856)
October 24 – Henry Charles Lea, American historian (born 1825)
November 5 – *H. L. Fischer, Pennsylvania German-language writer and translator (born 1822)
November 18 – Renée Vivien, English-born French-language Symbolist poet (born 1877)
December 14 – Frederick Greenwood, English novelist and journalist (born 1830)

Awards
Chancellor's Gold Medal: Dennis Holme Robertson
Nobel Prize in Literature: Selma Lagerlöf (first female recipient)
Newdigate Prize: Frank Ashton-Gwatkin
Knighthood: Arthur Wing Pinero
Prix Goncourt: Marius-Ary Leblond, En France

References

 
Years of the 20th century in literature